Mitchito "Mitch" Owens (born 24 September 2003) is a professional Australian rules footballer playing for the St Kilda Football Club in the Australian Football League (AFL). He was drafted in the 2021 AFL Draft at pick number 33 overall.

Early football career 

Playing for Beaumaris as a junior, Owens was awarded best on ground in the upset 2015 grand final win over Prahran. He played forward pocket for Beaumaris in 2019 and played school football for Mentone Grammar in the Associated Grammar Schools of Victoria competition. 

Owens was a member of St Kilda's Next Generation Academy, a pathway for indigenous and multicultural footballers who are typically under-represented and clubs incentivised with draft concessions.

In his draft year, Owens was tipped as a potential first-round draft pick after averaging 23.3 disposals, 5.7 marks and 3/7 inside 50s from his final three NAB League games. Owens played for the Sandringham Dragons in the NAB League and impressed in a game against Greater Western Victoria Rebels, collecting 25 disposals, seven clearances and five inside-50s. Owens was also a late call-up to Vic Metro's clash with Vic Country in July and picked up 29 disposals and a goal.

AFL career 

At the AFL draft on 25 November 2021, St Kilda matched a bid by Sydney with draft points for Owens and ultimately took him with pick 33 overall. Owens made his AFL debut in Round 1 2022 against Collingwood, collecting six disposals and two tackles. He was dropped back to the VFL following his debut game.

Owens earned a recall to the senior team in Round 11 against North Melbourne and put in an impressive display with 14 disposals, 10 tackles and 2 goals, however in the following game against Brisbane a concussion forced him to sit on the sidelines for several weeks.

References

External links

Living people
2003 births
St Kilda Football Club players
Australian people of Japanese descent